The Band of the Hetman Petro Sahaidachnyi National Ground Forces Academy is the official school military band in the Ukrainian Ground Forces. Its purpose is intended to promote the patriotic, cultural and aesthetic education of the Ground Forces personnel to the Ukrainian people domestically and to people abroad. In that purpose, it is part of the Military Music Department of the General Staff of the Ukrainian Armed Forces, which acts as the official service of military bands in the Armed Forces of Ukraine.

The band was created in November 1942 in Stalingrad. During the Second World War, the band at this time traveled across Europe along with the Red Army, passing through the roads of the Soviet Union to the streets of Prague. In 1946, one year after the war ended, it was divided into the Headquarters Band of the Carpathian Military District and the Carpathian Military Ensemble. It's travels have extended from the Carpathian mountains to the Pacific coast of the RSFSR, with the band having taking part in events that range from performing for Soviet Army troops in Afghanistan as well as performing in the aftermath of Chernobyl tragedy (directly in the exclusion zone).

With the establishment of the new Ground Forces Academy, the band was moved to serve as its academic school band. It currently consists of the following ensembles:

Parade Band
Concert Band
Choreographic group
Vocal group and soloists
Folk group

Today, the band provides musical accompaniment to ceremonial events at the academy and for servicemen and their families of the armed forces and the Lviv Garrison. It also takes part in many community events. The Band of the Military Conductor's Department was founded in 1993. Making it unique was the ability for members of the band to become a future military conductor in a military band.

References

Ukrainian military bands
Military units and formations established in 1942
1942 establishments in the Soviet Union
Military academy bands